Sense of Occasion is the twenty-fourth studio album by British folk-rock veterans Fairport Convention, released in February 2007.

Overview
The title comes from the fact that 2007 marks the 40th anniversary of the band (although only one member, Simon Nicol, remains from the original line-up).

Track listing
"Keep on Turning the Wheel" (Chris Leslie) – 4:18 
"Love on a Farmboy's Wages" (Andy Partridge) – 4:14 
"The Bowman's Return" (Ric Sanders) – 4:14 
"South Dakota to Manchester" (Leslie) – 4:12 
"Spring Song" (Leslie) – 4:37 
"Polly on the Shore" (Music: Dave Pegg; Lyrics: Dave Swarbrick, Trevor Lucas) – 5:03 
"Just Dandy" (Sanders) – 2:56 
"Tam Lin" (Traditional; arranged by Swarbrick) – 7:30 
"In Our Town" (Leslie) – 3:35 
"Edge of the World" (Leslie) – 4:08 
"Hawkwood's Army" (Pete Scrowther) – 4:24 
"The Vision" (Bob Miller, John Flanagan) – 4:21 
"Your Heart and Mine" (Sanders) – 3:40 
"Untouchable" (Glenn Tilbrook, Christopher Braid) – 4:28 
"Galileo's Apology" (PJ Wright) – 3:04 
"Best Wishes" (Steve Ashley) – 3:41

Personnel
Fairport Convention
 Ric Sanders – violin
 Simon Nicol – vocals, acoustic guitar, electric guitar, twelve-string guitar
 Gerry Conway – vocals, drums, percussion, harmonium
 Dave Pegg – vocals, bass guitar
 Chris Leslie – vocals, mandolin, bouzouki, violin

References

2007 albums
Fairport Convention albums